This article details the 2011–12 Indonesian Premier Division.

Week 4

Week 3

Week 2

Week 1

References

Group